Michela De Rossi (born 25 January 1993) is an Italian actress.

Career 
Born in Rome, she graduated at the Quirino International Theatre Academy in 2014.

She debuted in the 2018 drama film Boys Cry by Damiano and Fabio D'Innocenzo and then starred in the television series I topi by Antonio Albanese. In 2021, she portrayed Giuseppina Moltisanti in The Sopranos''' prequel The Many Saints of Newark. In 2022, she starred in lead roles in Con chi viaggi by YouNuts! and Io e Spotty'' by Cosimo Gomez.

Filmography

References

External links
 

1993 births
Living people
21st-century Italian actresses
Italian film actresses
Italian television actresses
Actresses from Rome